Moreland is an unincorporated community in Wayne County, in the U.S. state of Ohio.

History
Moreland was platted in 1829. Variant names were Moorefield, Mooreland, Moorland, and Morland. The community derives its name from George Morr, the original owner of the town site. A post office called Moorland was established in 1831, and remained in operation until 1902.

References

Unincorporated communities in Wayne County, Ohio
Unincorporated communities in Ohio